The Archdiocese of Antequera, Oaxaca is a Latin Church ecclesiastical territory or archdiocese of the Catholic Church in Mexico. The cathedral church is the Cathedral of Our Lady of the Assumption in the episcopal see of Oaxaca. It was erected on June 21, 1535.

The archdiocese covers part of the state of Oaxaca. A metropolitan see, its episcopal conference includes the suffragan dioceses of Puerto Escondido, Tehuantepec, Tuxtepec and the territorial prelatures of Huautla and Mixes. It is currently led by Archbishop Pedro Vázquez Villalobos.

, the archdiocese contained 113 parishes, 126 active diocesan priests, 39 religious priests, and 940,000 Catholics. It also had 268 women religious, 59 religious brothers, and 21 permanent deacons.

Diocesan bishops
The following is a list of the bishops and archbishops and their tenure of service:

Diocese of Antequera, Oaxaca
Juan Lopez de Zárate (1535–1555) Died
Bernardo de Albuquerque (1561–1579) Died
Bartolomé de Ledesma (1583–1604) Died
Baltazar de Cobarrubias y Múñoz (1605–1608) Appointed, Bishop of Michoacán
Juan de Cervantes (1608–1614) Died
Juan Bartolomé de Bohorquez e Hinojosa (1617–1633) Died
Leonel de Cervantes y Caravajal (1636–1637) Died
Bartolomé de Benavente y Benavides (1639–1652) Died
Francisco Diego Díaz de Quintanilla y de Hevía y Valdés (1653–1656) Died
Juan Alonso de Cuevas y Davalos (1658–1664) Appointed, Archbishop of México
Tomás de Monterroso (1664–1678) Died)
Nicolás Ortiz del Puerto y Colmenares Salgado (1679–1681) Died
Isidoro Sariñara y Medina Cuenca (1683–1696) Died
Manuel Plácido de Quirós de Porras (1698–1699) Died
Ángel de Maldonado, O. Cist. (1700–1728) Died
Francisco de Santiago y Calderón (1729–1736) Died
Tomás Montaño y Aarón (1737–1742) Died
Diego Felipe Gómez de Angulo (1744–1752) Died
Buenaventura Blanco y Elguero (Helguero) (1753–1764) Died
Miguel Anselmo Álvarez de Abreu y Valdéz (1765–1774) Died
José Gregorio Alonso de Ortigosa (1775–1793) Resigned
Gregorio Jose de Omaña y Sotomayor (1792–1797) Died
Antonio Bergosa y Jordán (1801–1817) Confirmed, Archbishop of Tarragona, Spain
Manuel Isidoro Perez Sánchez (1819–1837) Resigned
José Epigmenio Villanueva y Gomez de Eguiarreta (1839–1840) Died
Angel Mariano de Morales y Jasso (1841–1843) Died
Antonio Mantecón e Ibañez (1844–1852) Died
José Agustín Domínguez y Diaz (1854–1859) Died
José María Covarrubias y Mejía (1861–1867) Died
Vicente Fermín Márquez y Carrizosa (1868–1887) Died
Eulogio Gregorio Clemente Gillow y Zavalza (1887–1891) see below

Archdiocese of Antequera, Oaxaca
elevated June 23, 1891
Eulogio Gregorio Clemente Gillow y Zavalza (1891–1922) Died see above
José Othón Núñez y Zárate (1922–1941) Died
Fortino Gómez León (1942–1967) Retired
Ernesto Corripio y Ahumada (1967–1976) Appointed, Archbishop of Puebla de los Ángeles
Bartolomé Carrasco Briseño (1976–1993) Retired
Héctor González Martínez (1993–2003) Appointed, Archbishop of Durango
José Luis Chávez Botello (2003–2018)
Pedro Vázquez Villalobos (2018–present)

Coadjutor bishops
José Othón Núñez y Zárate (1922)
Héctor González Martínez (1988–1993)

Auxiliary bishops
Francisco Ramón Valentín de Casaus y Torres, O.P. (1807–1815), appointed Archbishop of Guatemala
José María Irigoyen y Munoz Cano (1842–1843)
Francisco Garcia Cantarines (1845–1847)
José de Jesús Clemens Alba Palacios (1954–1959), appointed Bishop of Tehuantepec, Oaxaca; but was auxiliary here again, 1970–1984
Bartolomé Carrasco Briseño (1967–1971), appointed Bishop of Tapachula, Chiapas; but returned here as Archbishop, 1976
Miguel Angel Alba Díaz (1995–2001), appointed Bishop of La Paz en la Baja California Sur
Óscar Armando Campos Contreras (2006–2010), appointed Bishop of Tehuantepec, Oaxaca
Gonzalo Alonso Calzada Guerrero (2012–2018), was Celaya Diocese seminary rector when appointed here; appointed Bishop of Tehuacán, Puebla

See also
List of Roman Catholic archdioceses in México

References

External links and additional sources
 (for Chronology of Bishops)
 (for Chronology of Bishops)

Antequera, Oaxaca
Roman Catholic dioceses established in the 16th century
Religious organizations established in 1535
Roman Catholic Ecclesiastical Province of Antequera, Oaxaca
Antequera, Oaxaca, Roman Catholic Archdiocese of
1535 establishments in New Spain